Peter Hackmair (born 26 June 1987) is a retired Austrian football midfielder. He played for FC Wacker in the Austrian Bundesliga among other teams. In August 2012, at his age 25, he ended his football career for his other passion, travelling.

References 

1987 births
Living people
Association football midfielders
Austrian footballers
Austria youth international footballers
Austria under-21 international footballers
SV Ried players
People from Vöcklabruck
Footballers from Upper Austria
FC Wacker Innsbruck (2002) players